Sir Thomas Fogge (died 13 July 1407) was an English politician and soldier.

Career
The names of Thomas Fogge's parents are not known with certainty, although he is said to have been the son of Sir Thomas Fogge, Knight of the Shire for Kent in 1377, 1379 and 1381, who married Anne, Countess of Joyeux in France, and was buried at Glastonbury, Somerset.

In his early years he was a soldier of fortune on the continent. He purchased land around Canterbury, in Chartham, Harbledown and Boughton under Blean. By October 1360 he had been knighted. He was elected Member of Parliament for Kent in 1376, 1378, November 1380, 1381, February 1383, October 1383, November 1384, and February 1388.

Fogge died on 13 July 1407. He was survived by his wife, and provided for her in his will. His heir was his grandson, William Fogge.

He was buried in Canterbury Cathedral.

Marriage and issue
Before May 1365 Fogge married Joan de Valence (d. 8 July 1420), widow of William Costede of Costede, Kent, and daughter of Sir Stephen de Valence of Repton, by whom he had three sons:

Thomas Fogge, eldest son, who married Eleanor St Leger, daughter of Sir Thomas St Leger, by whom he had a son, William Fogge, born 31 October 1396 at Cheriton, Kent. According to Robertson:

In the year 1396, Thomas (once mis-called or misprinted John) Fogge, junior, whose wife was Alianora (daughter of Thomas St. Leger), brought to [Cheriton] church, for baptism, his infant son and heir, William Fogge, who was ultimately the coheir also of his grandfather Thomas St. Leger. The priest, "Dom." or "Sir" William Newynton, declared to the assembled congregation "that God had, in that infant, multiplied his people after the late pestilence". Here also Thomas Fogge, the father of the infant, caused "Sir" William Newynton, to make an entry in the Missal or Service Book of the church to the effect that William Fogge (the infant) was born on the Vigil of All Saints in the year 1396. This entry was made in the presence of Ralph Norys and other parishioners upon All Souls Day 1396.

At the siege of Rouen in 1418 the Foster Roll blazoned his arms as: Argent on a fess between three annulets sable as many mullets of the field.

John Fogge, esquire, who was the father of Sir John Fogge (d. 1490).
His male line blazoned their arms as: Argent on a fess between three annulets sable as many mullets pierced of the field.

Another son, who died without issue.

Notes

References

External links
CP 25/1/114/298, number 110, Plea of covenant, 5 June 1418, William Wadham and John Wadham, querents, and William Fogge, son and heir of Thomas Fogge, deforciant Retrieved 25 September 2013
C 138/29/66, National Archives, Fogg, William, son of Thomas, jr and of Eleanor his wife, one of the daughters of the late Thomas St Leger, 1417/18 Retrieved 25 September 2013

Year of birth missing
1407 deaths
14th-century births
English MPs 1376
15th-century English people
English knights
English soldiers
14th-century soldiers
People from Canterbury
English MPs 1379
English MPs 1381
English MPs 1378
English MPs November 1380
English MPs February 1383
English MPs October 1383
English MPs November 1384
English MPs February 1388